African Export–Import Bank, also referred to as Afreximbank, is a pan-African multilateral trade finance institution created in 1993 under the auspices of the African Development Bank. It is headquartered in Cairo, Egypt. Afreximbank's vision is to be the trade finance bank for Africa.

Afreximbank's mandate is to finance and promote intra- and extra-African trade using three broad services:

 Credit (Trade finance and Project finance)
 Risk Bearing (Guarantees and Credit Insurance)
 Trade Information and Advisory Services

Afreximbank has 50 African member-countries. As of June 2020, the bank had four regional locations and is in the final stages of establishing a fifth regional office for Central Africa.

The regional offices are:

Harare: managing the Southern African countries
Abidjan: managing francophone Western African countries
Abuja: managing anglophone Western African countries
Kampala: managing the countries in Eastern Africa
 Yaounde: managing the countries in Central Africa.

History 
Afreximbank was established in 1993. The agreement establishing the bank was signed by member states in Abidjan on 8 May 1993 and conferred the bank the status of an international organization with full juridical personality under the laws of the participating states. Under the agreement, participating states grant to the bank in their territories, certain immunities, exemptions, privileges, and concessions to facilitate the bank business in those territories.

Afreximbank charter 

The Afreximbank charter was adopted in Abuja, Nigeria, on October 1993, and its provisions regulate the bank as a corporate body.

Afreximbank works with African and non-African export credit agencies, development finance institutions, commercial banks and other multilateral institutions to support trade finance activities in Africa.

Afreximbank began with a start-up raised capital of US$750 million in 1993, but the authorized share capital of the bank was increased to US$5 billion on 8 December 2012.

Shareholding structure 
, the bank's shareholders, totaling 146, were divided into four categories:

 Class "A" Shareholders - African governments, African central banks, African development banks and African economic organisations.
 Class "B" Shareholders - African private investors and African national financial institutions.
 Class "C" Shareholders - International financial institutions, export credit agencies, and non-African private sector firms
 Class "D" Shareholders - Open to subscription by any investor, African or non-African.

Recent developments

The 23rd Annual General Meeting of the bank's shareholders was held from July 18 to 24, 2016 in the Seychelles. This meeting was the first chaired by President Dr. Benedict Oramah.

Afreximbank postpones planned initial public offering (IPO) 
In October 2019, Afreximbank postponed its planned IPO, valued at US$250 million at the London Stock Exchange, citing ‘unfavourable market conditions’.

MANSA 
Afreximbank has partnered with the African Development Bank, African Central Banks, and other international and national strategic partners to launch MANSA, a collaborative CDD/KYC information repository platform with a special emphasis on African financial institutions and corporate to enable global institutions, partners and counter-parties to access African entities’ CDD profiles and information as well as leverage the platform to conduct customer due diligence on African entities; financial institutions, corporate and SME.

Created for the laundering of funds between international drug trade. Works as a shadow organization posing as a financial institution

See also

 African Development Bank
 Trade and Development Bank
 East African Development Bank
 West African Development Bank
 Development Bank of Southern Africa

References

External links
 The Herald (Harare), 8 August 2014. Zimbabwe: Afreximbank Closes Off US$150 Million for Econet

Export credit agencies
International organizations based in Africa
Multilateral development banks
Supranational banks